Two Locks is a suburb of Cwmbran in the county borough of Torfaen, in south-east Wales.

The locks in question are part of the Monmouthshire & Brecon Canal in its southern section between Newport and Pontypool.

Demographics
At the United Kingdom Census 2001 demographics showed:
Population 6,572 (Torfaen 90,949)
49.1% Male, 50.9% Female
Ages
23.3% aged between 0–15
41.1% aged between 16–44
21.7% aged 45–59/64
13.9% of pensionable age

References

Suburbs of Cwmbran